Jason Armstead (born September 18, 1979) is a former professional Canadian football and American football kick returner and wide receiver. Armstead is currently a free-agent. He was most recently a member of the Calgary Stampeders in the Canadian Football League. He was signed by the Pittsburgh Steelers as an undrafted free agent in 2003. He played college football for Mississippi.

He has also been a member of the Ottawa Renegades, Saskatchewan Roughriders, Hamilton Tiger-Cats, Montreal Alouettes, Winnipeg Blue Bombers, Las Vegas Locomotives, and the Edmonton Eskimos.

Professional career
In 2003, Armstead played three pre-season games as a kick returner for the Pittsburgh Steelers of the National Football League. Armstead was signed by the Ottawa Renegades of the CFL in 2004 and he was named to the CFL All-Star team for the 2005 CFL season. Armstead was selected third overall by Saskatchewan in the Renegades dispersal draft in 2006. On August 19, 2007, he was traded to the Hamilton Tiger-Cats for running back/returner Corey Holmes and receiver Chris Getzlaf. On July 21, 2008, Armstead was released from the Montreal Alouettes.

On August 31, 2009, he was again signed by the Saskatchewan Roughriders. On February 13, 2010, Armstead was charged with several criminal offenses stemming from an incident in Pascagoula, Mississippi involving his former girlfriend's purse. On April 15, 2010, it was announced that the Roughriders had released Armstead.

On October 21, 2010, Armstead was signed by the Edmonton Eskimos. After being released in the following off-season, Armstead was re-signed on August 8, 2011, following injuries to Fred Stamps and Adarius Bowman. He was again released on January 19, 2012.

On September 12, 2012, the Calgary Stampeders signed Armstead as a receiver/kick returner. Armstead is entering his ninth CFL season and has recorded 13,812 combined yards and 24 touchdowns in 106 games played with Ottawa, Saskatchewan, Hamilton, Montreal, Winnipeg and Edmonton. On February 25, 2013 Armstead was released by the Calgary Stampeders.

Career statistics

References

External links
Calgary Stampeders bio

1979 births
Living people
American football wide receivers
Calgary Stampeders players
Canadian football wide receivers
Edmonton Elks players
Hamilton Tiger-Cats players
Las Vegas Locomotives players
Montreal Alouettes players
Ole Miss Rebels football players
Ottawa Renegades players
People from Moss Point, Mississippi
Pittsburgh Steelers players
Players of American football from Mississippi
Saskatchewan Roughriders players
Winnipeg Blue Bombers players